The University of California, Merced (UC Merced) is a public land-grant research university and Hispanic-serving institution located in Merced, California, and is the tenth and newest of the University of California (UC) campuses. Established in 2005, UC Merced was founded to "address chronically low levels of educational attainment in the region." UC Merced enrolls 8,321 undergraduates and 772 graduates with 63.8% of students receiving Pell Grants, more than 99% of UC Merced students coming from California, and the largest percentage of low-income students from underrepresented ethnic groups in the UC system.

UC Merced is one of the largest employers in Merced County, and contributes about $1.7 billion to the San Joaquin Valley. The university is also one of the most sustainable universities in the country under its Triple Zero Commitment, with every building on campus being environmentally certified. UC Merced is classified among "R2: Doctoral Universities – High research activity", with undergraduate programs ranked 97th overall among U.S. national research universities by U.S. News & World Report.

History

By the 1980s, the San Joaquin Valley was the state's largest and most populous region without a UC campus. On May 19, 1988, the UC Regents voted to begin planning for a campus in the region in response to increasing enrollment and growth constraints at existing UC campuses. In 1989, they authorized UC President David P. Gardner to plan up to three new campuses to address these needs. On May 19, 1995, the Regents selected Merced over two other finalist sites in Madera and Fresno, midway between Fresno and Modesto, as the location for the University of California's tenth campus.

An important hurdle to the construction of UC Merced happened with the passage of Proposition 203 which for the first time authorized bond funds to be used to construct new buildings in the UC and California State University systems. In 2001, the university used an $11 million grant from the David and Lucile Packard Foundation to acquire a 7,030-acre site adjacent to Lake Yosemite, just north of Merced, from the Virginia Smith Trust, the largest acreage the UC system has acquired for one of its campuses.

A public golf course known as the Merced Hills Golf Course had been constructed at the site in the early 1990s. This course was shut down to make way for the new campus when the original site for the campus was made unavailable due to the discovery of fairy shrimp – an endangered species – on the originally proposed site. Since the construction of the golf course had negated concerns about wetland and vernal pool environmental issues, building the campus at this location was easier than fighting to save the original construction site.

UC Merced established a satellite campus in Bakersfield, California in 2001 in its downtown University Square. The satellite campus extended a UC education to prospective college-bound students of Kern County and the southern San Joaquin Valley before UC Merced opened its official campus in Merced. Classes and counseling were also provided at the Bakersfield center to newly admitted UC students. In 2011, UC Merced closed its Bakersfield campus in a cost-cutting effort. An administrative building was then planned to be located in downtown Merced.

The campus groundbreaking ceremony was held October 25, 2002, and the first day of undergraduate classes was September 6, 2005 with 706 freshmen, 132 transfer students, and 37 graduate students.  Three years and eight months later, on May 16, 2009, First Lady Michelle Obama gave the commencement address for the university's first full graduating class.

In 2010, the United States Census Bureau made UC Merced its own separate census-designated place.  Later that same year, the new student housing facilities, The Summits, opened to provide two additional residential halls for incoming students. The two four-story buildings, Tenaya Hall and Cathedral Hall, are reserved primarily for incoming freshmen students. Three years later, another housing facility, Half Dome, was built next to the existing Tenaya and Cathedral Halls. Half Dome houses both freshman and continuing students. The university is a census-designated place (CDP) that is uninhabited as of both the 2010 and 2020 census. In addition to lacking population the University covers all of it land in this census-designated place.

In January 2015, UC Merced was nationally classified with the Carnegie Classification for community engagement, along with UC Davis and UCLA.

On November 4, 2015, 18-year-old student Faisal Mohammad stabbed and injured four people with a hunting knife before being shot to death by a campus police officer.

In November 2015, the Regents of the University of California approved a $1.14 billion proposal, known as the 2020 Plan, to double the capacity of UC Merced, boosting its enrollment by nearly 4,000 students. The new buildings were completed in early 2021.
In April 2019, the school's student government, the Associated Students of UC Merced, cut off funding for UC Merced's only student-run newspaper, The Prodigy.

UC Merced claims to be the only institution in the United States whose buildings are all LEED certified. Its Triple Net Zero Commitment is expected to create zero net landfill waste and zero net greenhouse gas emissions by the year 2020.

UC Merced announced a partnership with UCSF and UCSF Fresno to create a brand new medical school program by the year 2023, garnering support from governor Gavin Newsom.

Organization and governance

As with all UC campuses, UC Merced is headed by a chancellor. Carol Tomlinson-Keasey held the position from 1999 until she resigned on August 31, 2006. She returned to teaching and research in psychology in 2007 and later died of breast cancer in 2009. On September 21, 2006, the Regents named Roderic B. Park, a former interim chancellor at the University of Colorado at Boulder, as the acting chancellor for UC Merced. Park remained acting chancellor until Sung-Mo (Steve) Kang, Dean of the Baskin School of Engineering at UC Santa Cruz, took office in early March 2007. Kang held the position from 2006 to 2011, when he stepped down so he could return to research and teaching.

After a nationwide search, on May 24, 2011, the Regents of the University of California named Dorothy Leland, then president of Georgia College & State University, to be the university's newest chancellor. On May 13, 2019, Leland announced that she would be stepping down from her position, effective Aug 15, 2019. UC Executive Vice President and Chief Financial Officer Nathan Brostrom served as interim chancellor until July 2020. In July 2020, Juan Sánchez Muñoz, then president of University of Houston-Downtown, ascended to the position of Chancellor.

The campus takes advantage of the surrounding environment by investigating issues relating to environmental systems of the Central Valley and Sierra Nevada, and of its youth by having programs in genetic research conducted in state-of-the-art research labs. It also benefits from proximity to Silicon Valley and other major universities. Research in fields like language acquisition and cultural issues is facilitated by the highly diverse ethnic makeup of the Central Valley.

UC Merced operates on a semester system rather than the quarter system for its academic term. The Berkeley campus is the only other UC campus on a semester system.

Academics

UC Merced has three schools offering 27 undergraduate majors and 25 minors:

 School of Engineering
 School of Natural Sciences
 School of Social Sciences, Humanities and Arts

The Science and Engineering Building 2 opened in 2014. The Classroom and Office Building 2 opened in 2016.

The UC Merced Graduate Division offers 18 graduate programs:
 Applied Mathematics (M.S., Ph.D.)
 Bioengineering (M.S., PhD)
 Chemistry and Chemical Biology (M.S., Ph.D.)
 Cognitive and Information Sciences (Ph.D.)
 Economics (Ph.D.)
 Electrical Engineering and Computer Science (M.S., PhD)
 Environmental Systems (M.S., Ph.D.)
 Interdisciplinary Humanities (M.A., Ph.D.)
 Management of Complex Systems (M.S., PhD)
 Master of Management Professional Degree (M.M.)
 Materials and Biomaterials Science Engineering (M.S., PhD)
 Mechanical Engineering (M.S., PhD)
 Physics (M.S., PhD)
 Political Science, (Ph.D.)
 Psychological Sciences (Ph.D.)
 Public Health (Ph.D.)
 Quantitative and Systems Biology (M.S., PhD)
 Sociology (PhD)

Graduate degree holders have found work in faculty positions at different colleges and universities, while others have chosen to enter government service.

In 2011, the campus was granted accreditation by WASC. In 2014, the School of Engineering received an ABET accreditation for the Mechanical Engineering, Environmental Engineering, and Materials Science and Engineering programs.

The university is also home to the CCBM Summer Internship Program, an undergraduate research fellowship for non-UC Merced students sponsored by the NSF CREST Center for Cellular and Biomolecular Machines.

Rankings

UC Merced was tied for 42th "Top Public School" and tied for 97th in the 2022 rankings of "Best National Universities" in the U.S. by U.S. News & World Report. Also in the same rankings, it was ranked 5th in "Top Performers on Social Mobility", 171st in "Best Value Schools", and tied for 123th in "Best Undergraduate Engineering Programs" at schools whose highest degree is a doctorate.

Admissions and enrollment

UC Merced received 25,368 undergraduate applications for admission for the Fall 2019 incoming freshman class; 18,263 were admitted (72.0%).

Undergraduate enrollment in Fall 2019 was 51.7% women, 47.5% men and 0.8% unknown; approximately 99% were from California.

UC Merced saw an increase in application for the 2021 freshman class, they received a record breaking number of applications totaling 30,105 between freshman and transfers.

UC Merced also saw an increase in applications for their graduate school program, there was a 25% increase last spring. The application pool consisted of 40% being women and 23% being minority students.

Research institutes 

 Health Sciences Research Institute (HSRI)
 Sierra Nevada Research Institute (SNRI)
 University of California Advanced Solar Technologies Institute (UC Solar)
NSF CREST Center for Cellular and Biomolecular Machines (CCBM)
Merced nAnomaterials Center for Energy and Sensing (MACES)
Nicotine and Cannabis Policy Center (NCPC)

In 2007, UC Merced researchers obtained nearly $7 million in funding from the National Science Foundation. Grant funding for research has reached over $168.9 million in 2013.

Campus 

The campus is bounded by Lake Yosemite on one side, and two irrigation canals run through the campus. The campus master plan was developed by Skidmore, Owings & Merrill, its initial infrastructure by Arup, and its first buildings were designed by Skidmore, Owings & Merrill, Thomas Hacker and Associates, and EHDD Architecture. The library and central power plant have been classified as Leadership in Energy and Environmental Design Gold structures in terms of their high energy efficiency and low environmental impact. The campus is located about seven miles (11 km) north of downtown Merced in the middle of a cattle ranch.

The revised plan covers a total of  rather than the original  proposed in 2000.

Kolligian Library 

The library was the first building to open on campus. During the Fall 2005 semester, while construction of the Classroom and Science/Engineering buildings was still taking place, all academic courses were conducted in the library.  Its official motto is "Not what other research libraries are, what they will be."

The library building is named after Leo and Dottie Kolligian. Leo served as the chairman of the UC Board of Regents in 1988 when the board decided to explore building a 10th campus, in the San Joaquin Valley. The first floor of the library was dedicated by Ed and Jeanne Kashian. The McFadden-Willis Reading Room is located on the fourth floor and named in honor of the McFadden and Willis children by Christine McFadden. The library also has a technology classroom dedicated by Doris Gonella in honor of her late husband Louis, The Gonella Discovery Room.

The library offers 10 public workstations for students, faculty, staff and visitors to access electronic resources.  The library contains more electronic holdings than print holdings, consisting of about 70,000 online journals and 3.965 million electronic books (including 3.15 million HathiTrust full-text books), compared to 102,000 print books. In addition, the library provides access to 937 databases.

Kolligian is a Green library and has Gold LEED certification.

Athletics

The UC Merced athletic teams are called the Golden Bobcats. The university is a member of the National Association of Intercollegiate Athletics (NAIA), primarily competing in the California Pacific Conference (Cal Pac) since the 2011–12 academic year.

UC Merced competes in nine intercollegiate varsity sports: Men's sports include basketball, cross country, soccer and volleyball; while women's sports include basketball, cross country, soccer, volleyball and water polo.

Goals
UC Merced hopes to join the National Collegiate Athletic Association (NCAA) in the near future. The school's goal is to compete at the NCAA Division II level as part of the California Collegiate Athletic Association (CCAA).

Facilities
On November 13, 2006, the university opened its gymnasium. The Joseph Edward Gallo Recreation and Wellness Center, named after the rancher and dairy farmer who donated money for the facility's construction, features an "NCAA-sized basketball court, workout facilities, room for performances, wellness and fitness education and the Rajender Reddy Student Health Center".

Student life

Approximately 2,100 students currently live on campus in the Valley and Sierra Terraces and the Summits, which includes Tenaya and Cathedral Halls, 4.2 miles (6.8 km) away from the city of Merced. The most recent addition is Half Dome Hall which completed the UC Merced's first residential square.  The Summits includes cleaning services, study lounges, a market, and a game room. Student housing, as well as the dining commons, are closed during winter break.  Much of the student life in the Residence Halls is led by the Resident Assistants (RAs) and Lead Resident Assistants (LRAs) through various programs and activities.

Due to the United States housing bubble and the high cost of bond-funded student housing ($13,720 on-campus compared to $7,000 off campus), many students choose to live in new housing subdivisions outside of campus. The Cattracks transit system serves student-dense developments.

The university's Campus Activities Board (CAB) engages students in campus-wide activities such as the annual Treats N' Beats, CAB Cinema, Enchanted Ball, and more. Past guests that have been brought to these campus activities by CAB include Sage the Gemini, J. Holiday, and George Lopez.

Additionally, many students visit nearby Lake Yosemite which includes recreational swimming, fishing, and water skiing. Merced has several artistic venues which host plays, concerts, and art shows. These include The Mainzer Theater, The Partisan, Merced Multicultural Arts Center, and Playhouse Merced. Castle Air Museum is within close driving distance from Merced. Merced is known as the "Gateway to Yosemite" and it is common for students recreational use Yosemite National Park where they may hike, snowboard, rock climb, and camp overnight.

Student publications include The Prodigy, student newspaper, Bobcat Radio, student radio station, The Undergraduate Research Journal (URJ), The Undergraduate Historical Journal, and literary journals The Kumquat and Imagination Dead Imagine. The Vernal Pool  is a student literary journal for fiction, poetry, creative non-fiction, and visual art.

CatTracks public transportation system 
The university operates its own public transportation system, CatTracks. The system has several routes between the University Transit Center and off-campus housing developments with high student populations.

Student governments
The founding graduate students, who joined the Graduate School of UC Merced in early 2004, initiated the Graduate Student Association (GSA) in that year, before the university officially opened its doors to undergraduate students in the fall of 2005. The constitution and by-laws were prepared by them. They were then approved by all the graduate students.

The undergraduate students of UC Merced have initiated and established their own student government.  The Committee on Constitution and By-Laws was established in fall 2005 and was responsible for writing the constitution for the Associated Students of UC Merced (ASUCM).  Elections for the ratification of the constitution were held in April, 2006. The constitution was approved by a majority of the student body, officially establishing ASUCM, which serves as the official representative and voice of students.

Clubs
There are approximately 200 student run clubs, including: RadioBio, Bobcat Band, The Prodigy, Bobcat Radio, Society of Hispanic Professional Engineers (SHPE), Bobcat Model United Nations (MUN), Society of Automotive Engineers (SAE), Sports Shooting, Society of Asian Scientists and Engineers (SASE), Merced Pre-Law Society, Business Society, National Society of Black Engineers (NSBE), American Women Making A Difference, Black Student Union (BSU), Lambda Alliance, Society of Women Engineers, American Society of Mechanical Engineers, Math Society, Amnesty International, American Medical Student Association, Colleges Against Cancer, Chinese Student Association, Circle K International, Economics Club, Hermanas Unidas de UCM, Korean American Coalition (KAC), Hmong Student Association (HSA), Nikkei Student Union (NSU), The UC Merced Historical Society, Dance Coalition, Distinguished Ladies,  Student Transfer Outreach and Mentor Program, Democrats at UC Merced, HHM (Hip Hop Movement), Society of Freethinkers, Intervarsity Christian Fellowship, Martial Arts Club, Microfinance Project Student Association, Muslim Student Association, NORML, Persian Student Association of UC Merced (PSAUCM), Pilipino American Alliance (PAA), Anime Club, League of Legends Club at UC Merced (UCMLoL), College Republicans at UC Merced, South Asian Student Association, Merced Indian Graduate Student Association (MIGSA), Taekwondo (TKD), Rotaract, UCM Symphonics Acapella Group (UCMSA), UNICEF at UC Merced, Best Buddies, Project Smile, rock climbing, Yosemite Leadership Program, bakery clubs, archery clubs, and frisbee golf clubs.

Greek life

 North-American InterfraternityConference Fraternities
 Omega Delta Phi ΩΔΦ, Alpha Psi chapter
International Fraternities
 Sigma Chi ΣΧ, Lambda Delta chapter
 Kappa Sigma ΚΣ, Rho Omicron chapter
 Pi Kappa Phi ΠΚΦ, Kappa Mu chapter
 Pi Lambda Phi ΠΛΦ,

 National Panhellenic ConferenceWomen's Fraternities and Sororities
 Delta Delta Delta ΔΔΔ, Epsilon Kappa chapter
 Delta Gamma ΔΓ, Eta Rho chapter
 Kappa Kappa Gamma ΚΚΓ, Eta Xi chapter
 Phi Mu ΦΜ, Eta Sigma chapter
 Latina-Based Sororities
 Lambda Theta Nu ΛΘΝ, Alpha Pi chapter
 Kappa Delta Chi ΚΔΧ, Beta Lambda chapter
 Mult-Cultural Sororities
 Sigma Theta Psi ΣΘΨ
Professional Co-ed Fraternities
 Delta Epsilon Mu ΔΕΜ, Theta chapter
 Phi Delta Epsilon ΦΔΕ, CA Lambda Premedical chapter
 Alpha Kappa Psi ΑΚΨ, Psi Upsilon chapter
 Theta Tau ΘΤ, Mu Delta chapter
 Alpha Phi Omega ΑΦΩ, Alpha Eta Gamma chapter
 Phi Alpha Delta ΦΑΔ
 Delta Sigma Pi ΔΣΠ, Tau Chi Chapter

Alumni
The UC Merced Alumni Association (UCMAA) consists of more than 16,000 living members. The UC Merced Alumni Association is a non-dues organization. UCMAA membership is granted upon successful attainment of a UC Merced undergraduate or graduate degree. The association is led by a volunteer board of directors, which is staffed by the UC Merced Office of Alumni Relations.

As stated by the LA Times, "Although most UC Merced alumni are still in their 20s, 11% of them contributed to their alma mater — outstripping the giving rate of all other UC campuses except UC Santa Barbara (16%) and UC Berkeley (12%). UCLA's rate was 8%, and UC Riverside, the most comparable campus, was 4%."

See also

:Category:University of California, Merced faculty
:Category:University of California, Merced alumni

Notes

References

External links

 
 Official athletics website

 
Merced
Educational institutions established in 2005
Schools accredited by the Western Association of Schools and Colleges
University of California, Merced
University of California, Merced
2005 establishments in California
Census-designated places in California
University of California, Merced
University of California, Merced
Universities established in the 2000s